My Way is the seventh studio album by Jamaican recording artist Lady Saw. The album featured guest artists such as Eve, Camar Doyles, & Ding Dong. A duet with Ali Campbell on "I Do Love You" was recorded for the album, but not included on the final track listing.

Reception
AllMusic gave the album 4/5 stars and a positive review: 

Reggae Vibes fans gave the album a rating of "Very Good", with the accompanying review by the website stating:

Singles
Several singles were taken from the album. The first, "Party 'Til December", was released on August 10, 2010.

Track listing

References

2010 albums
Lady Saw albums